Trivellona galea is a species of small sea snail, a marine gastropod mollusk in the family Triviidae, the false cowries or trivias.

Description

Distribution
This marine species occurs off New Caledonia.

References

 Dolin, L. (2001). Les Triviidae (Mollusca: Caenogastropoda) de l'Indo-Pacifique: Révision des genres Trivia, Dolichupis et Trivellona = Indo-Pacific Triviidae (Mollusca: Caenogastropoda): Revision of Trivia, Dolichupis and Trivellona. in: Bouchet, P. et al. (Ed.) Tropical deep-sea benthos. Mémoires du Muséum national d'Histoire naturelle. Série A, Zoologie. 185: 201-241
 Fehse D. (2002) Beiträge zur Kenntnis der Triviidae (Mollusca: Gastropoda) V. Kritische Beurteilung der Genera und Beschreibung einer neuen Art der Gattung Semitrivia Cossmann, 1903. Acta Conchyliorum 6: 3-48.
 Fehse D. & Grego J. (2004) Contribution to the knowledge of the Triviidae (Mollusca: Gastropoda). IX. Revision of the genus Trivellona. Berlin and Banska Bystrica. Pubished as a CD in 2004; as a book in 2009.

Triviidae
Gastropods described in 2001